Jeonggang of Silla (c.863–887) (r. 886–887) was the 50th ruler of the Korean kingdom of Silla.  He was the son of King Gyeongmun; his siblings included his predecessor King Heongang and his successor Queen Jinseong.

Jeonggang rose to the throne when his brother Heongang died without an heir.  Jeonggang died in turn less than two years later.  In his final year, he put down the rebellion of Kim Yo.

The tomb of King Jeonggang lies to the southeast of Borisa in Gyeongju.

Family 
Parents
 Father: Gyeongmun of Silla (841–875) 
 Grandfather: Kim Gye–myeong (김계명)
Grandmother: Madam Gwanghwa (광화부인)
 Mother: Queen Munui (문의왕후), daughter of King Heonan
Maternal grandfather: Heonan of Silla (헌안왕)
Maternal grandmother: Unknown

See also
List of Korean monarchs
List of Silla people
Unified Silla

References

Silla rulers
887 deaths
9th-century Korean monarchs
Year of birth unknown
Year of birth uncertain